Dennis Grey (born August 26, 1947 in San Diego, California) is a retired professional basketball center who played two seasons in the American Basketball Association (ABA) as a member of the Los Angeles Stars (1968–69) and the New York Nets (1969–70). He attended California Western University.

External links
 

Living people
1947 births
American men's basketball players
Basketball players from San Diego
Centers (basketball)
Los Angeles Stars players
New York Nets players
United States International Gulls men's basketball players